KOGI-LP is a low power radio station broadcasting out of Big Pine, California. It is licensed to the Big Pine Paiute Tribe of the Owens Valley.

History
KOGI-LP began broadcasting on September 16, 2014.

References

External links
 
 

Inyo County, California
2015 establishments in California
OGI-LP
Radio stations established in 2015
OGI-LP